The Cuba men's national basketball team represents Cuba at international competitions. It won the bronze medal at 1972 Summer Olympics and finished in 4th place at the 1974 FIBA World Championship. It is the only team from the Caribbean to win a medal at a major global event.

Competitive record

Olympics

Friendship Games

FIBA World Cup

FIBA AmeriCup

Pan American Games

Centrobasket

Caribebasket

Current roster



Past roster  
Roster for the 2015 FIBA Americas Championship.

Depth chart

Head coach position
 Daniel Scott: 2001–2011
 Leonardo Perez: 2012–2014
 Daniel Scott: 2015–2017
 Yoanis Zaldivar: 2017
 José "Pepe" Ramírez: 2017-2019
 Eduardo Moya: 2020-present

Past rosters
1948 Olympic Games: finished 13th among 23 teams

Alfredo "Bebo" Faget, Francisco "Frank" Lavernia, Raúl García Ordóñez, Federico "Fico" López, Casimiro García Artime, Juan García, José Llanusa, Ramón Wiltz, Mario Agüero, Joaquín Agüero, Mario Quintero, Fabio Ruiz, Llaneras Rodríguez, Otero Vázquez, José Miguel Álvarez Pozo

1952 Olympic Games: finished 14th among 23 teams

Alfredo "Bebo" Faget, Carlos García Ordóñez, Federico "Fico" López, Juan García, Casimiro García Artime, Ramón Wiltz, Mario Quintero, Fabio Ruiz, Mario Agüero, Felipe de la Pozas y Piad, Carlos Bea, Armando Estrada Rivero, Alberto Escoto Valdés

1968 Olympic Games: finished 11th among 16 teams

Ruperto Herrera Tabio, Pedro Chappe Garcia, Franklin Standard, Rafael Cañizares, Conrado Pérez, Pablo García, Cesar Valdés,  Cuesta, Jacinto González, Miguel Montalvo, Miguel Calderón Gómez, Carlos del Pozo (Coach: Stepas Butautas)

1970 World Championship: finished 8th among 13 teams

Ruperto Herrera Tabio, Pedro Chappe Garcia, Franklin Standard, Conrado Pérez, Tomás Herrera Martínez, Rafael Cañizares, Juan Domecq, Miguel Álvarez Pozo, Alejandro Urgelles Guibot, Oscar Varona Varona, Miguel Calderón Gómez, Francisco Varona (Coach: Stepas Butautas)

1972 Olympic Games: finished 3rd among 16 teams

Ruperto Herrera Tabio, Pedro Chappe Garcia, Juan Domecq, Franklin Standard, Alejandro Urgelles Guibot, Rafael Cañizares, Oscar Varona Varona, Tomás Herrera Martínez, Miguel Álvarez Pozo, Miguel Calderón Gómez, Juan Roca Brunet, Conrado Pérez (Coach: Juan Carmelo Ortega Díaz)

1974 World Championship: finished 4th among 14 teams

Ruperto Herrera Tabio, Pedro Chappe Garcia, Miguel Álvarez Pozo, Tomás Herrera Martínez, Juan Domecq, Oscar Varona Varona, Miguel Calderón Gómez, Alejandro Urgelles Guibot, Rafael Cañizares, Conrado Pérez, Juan Roca Brunet, Alejandro Lázaro Ortiz (Coach: Juan Carmelo Ortega Díaz)

1976 Olympic Games: finished 7th among 12 teams

Ruperto Herrera Tabio, Pedro Chappe Garcia, Juan Domecq, Tomás Herrera Martínez, Oscar Varona Varona, Félix Morales, Alejandro Urgelles Guibot, Daniel Scott, Rafael Cañizares, Juan Roca Brunet, Alejandro Lázaro Ortiz, Ángel Padrón (Coach: Juan Carmelo Ortega Díaz)

1980 Olympic Games: finished 6th among 12 teams

Ruperto Herrera Tabio, Tomás Herrera Martínez, Miguel Calderón Gómez, Félix Morales, Daniel Scott, Alejandro Urgelles Guibot, Alejandro Lázaro Ortiz, Raúl Dubois, Pedro Abreu, Jorge More, Generoso Márquez, Noangel Luaces (Coach: Pedro Chappe Garcia)

1986 World Championship: finished 11th among 24 teams

Daniel Scott, Félix Morales, Raúl Dubois, Pedro Abreu, Luis Calderón, Noangel Luaces, Eduardo Cabrera, Luciano Rivero, Roberto Simón Salomón, Leonardo Pérez, José Carlos Caballero, Pedro Cobarrubia (Coach: Juan Carmelo Ortega Díaz)

1994 World Championship: finished 15th among 16 teams

Richard Matienzo, Leonardo Pérez, Lazaro Borrell, Roberto Carlos Herrera, Roberto Simón Salomón, Ángel Oscar Caballero, Augusto Duquesne, Ulises Goire, José Luis Díaz, Juan Leopoldo Vázquez, Edel Casanova, Yudit Abreu (Coach: Miguel Calderón Gómez)

See also
Cuba women's national basketball team
Cuba national under-19 basketball team
Cuba national under-17 basketball team
Cuba national 3x3 team
Legionarios del Baloncesto Cubano

References

External links 
Latinbasket.com - Cuba Men National Team
Cuba Sport - Basketball
FIBA Profile
Cuba Basketball Records at FIBA Archive

Videos
Cuba v Venezuela - Game Highlights - Group B - 2015 FIBA Americas Championship Youtube.com video

 
1937 establishments in Cuba